Syed Abdullah Khalid ( — 20 May 2017) was a Bangladeshi sculptor and painter. He was awarded Ekushey Padak by the Government of Bangladesh in February 2017.

Early life and education
Khalid was born in Sylhet in the then British India. He completed his BFA in painting in 1969 from East Pakistan College of Arts and Crafts (presently Faculty of Fine Arts, University of Dhaka) and did his MFA in painting and sculpture from the University of Chittagong in 1974.

Career and work

Khalid's works included distinctive commissions like Aparajeyo Bangla, a monument on liberation war of Bangladesh in the University of Dhaka campus (1973–79), the terracotta relief on socio-cultural heritage at the Bangladesh Bank headquarters (1995–96) and a 447 square foot mural Abahaman Bangla at the Bangladesh Television Center (1974).

Khalid had exhibited solo three times since and he was awarded first prize in the Second National Sculpture Exhibition organized by the Bangladesh Shilpakala Academy in 1983. At various times he was nominated judge by Bangladesh Shilpakala Academy for national level exhibitions. In 1987 he was appointed team leader for participation in SAARC Workshop on Traditional Terracotta held in Madras, India. His works can be seen in the permanent collection of the National Museum of Bangladesh, the Bangladesh Shilpakala Academy, the Prime Minister's Residence and other important private and institutional collections. 

Khalid was a professor of sculpture at Institute of Fine Arts, the University of Chittagong till 2012.

Honors
The Government of Bangladesh issued a commemorative stamp (1990–91) and a silver coin (1998) showing Khalid's most notable work, Aparajeyo Bangla. He was awarded Shilpakala Padak in 2014 and Ekushey Padak in 2017.

Death
Khalid was taken to Dhaka's Central Hospital on 2 May 2017 from complications of chronic obstructive pulmonary disease and then transferred to BIRDEM's intensive care unit on 10 May. He died on 20 May at the age of 75.

References

1942 births
2017 deaths
Bangladeshi sculptors
Bangladeshi painters
University of Dhaka alumni
University of Dhaka Faculty of Fine Arts alumni
Academic staff of the University of Chittagong
Recipients of the Ekushey Padak
People from Sylhet Division
Respiratory disease deaths in Bangladesh
Deaths from chronic obstructive pulmonary disease